Dadoychus is a genus of longhorn beetles of the subfamily Lamiinae, containing the following species:

 Dadoychus flavocinctus Chevrolat, 1833
 Dadoychus mucuim Galileo & Martins, 1998
 Dadoychus nigrus Galileo & Martins, 2009

References

Hemilophini